Marie NDiaye (born 4 June 1967) is a French novelist, playwright and screenwriter. She published her first novel, Quant au riche avenir, when she was 17. She won the Prix Goncourt in 2009. Her play Papa doit manger is the sole play by a living female writer to be part of the repertoire of the Comédie française.  She co-wrote the screenplay for the 2022 legal drama Saint Omer alongside its director Alice Diop, and Amrita David. In September 2022 the film was selected as France's official selection for Best International Film at the 95th Academy Awards.

Biography
NDiaye was born in 1967 in Pithiviers, France, to a French mother and a Senegalese father. She grew up with her mother and her brother Pap Ndiaye in the suburbs of Paris. Her parents met as students in the mid-1960s, but her father returned to Senegal when she was one year old.

She began writing at the age of 12. As a senior in high school, she was discovered by Jerome Lindon, founder of Éditions de Minuit, who published her first novel, Quant au riche avenir, in 1985.

She subsequently wrote six more novels, all published by Minuit, and a collection of short stories. She also wrote her Comédie classique, a 200-page novel made up of a single sentence, which was published by Éditions P.O.L in 1988, when she was 21 years old. In addition, NDiaye has written a number of plays. She co-wrote the screenplay for White Material with director Claire Denis. Her 2003 drama Papa doit manger is distinguished as the second play by a female writer to be taken into the repertoire of the Comédie française.

In 1998, NDiaye wrote a letter to the press in which she argued that her novel La Sorcière, published two years earlier, had strongly informed the content of Naissance des fantômes, the second novel of successful author Marie Darrieussecq.

Her novel Trois femmes puissantes won the 2009 Prix Goncourt. In his 2013 critical study of the author, Marie NDiaye: Blankness and Recognition, British academic Andrew Asibong describes her as "the epitome of a certain kind of cultural brilliance". In his  psychoanalytic exploration of the writer's evocation of trauma and disavowal, he says that "NDiaye's work explores the violence done to the subject's capacity for feeling and knowing".

Exile in Berlin

In an interview published by Les Inrockuptibles on 30 August 2009, NDiaye declared about Sarkozy's France, 
"I find that France monstrous. The fact that we [with her companion, writer  and their three children-- editor's note] have chosen to live in Berlin for two years is far from being unrelated to that. We left just after the elections, in a large part because of Sarkozy, even if I am very aware that saying that can seem snobbish. I find that atmosphere of vulgarity and heavy policing detestable ... Besson, Hortefeux, all of those people, I find them monstrous".

Awards and honors

2001: Prix Femina for Rosie Carpe
2009: Prix Goncourt for Trois femmes puissantes (Three Strong Women)
2012: Grand prix du théâtre de l'Académie française
2015: Nelly Sachs Prize
2016: Ladivine longlisted for Man Booker International Prize
2017: Ladivine shortlisted for Best Translated Book Award
2018: Ladivine shortlisted for the International Dublin Literary Award

Works

Novels and short stories
 Quant au riche avenir – Les Editions de Minuit, 1985
 Comédie classique – , 1988
 La femme changée en bûche – Minuit, 1989
 En famille – Minuit, 1991
 Translated into English as Among Family by Heather Doyal – Angela Royal Publishing, 1997
 Un temps de saison – Minuit, 1994
 Translated into English as That Time of Year by Jordan Stump – Two Lines Press, 2020
 La Sorcière – Minuit, 1996
 Rosie Carpe – Minuit, Prix Femina 2001
 Translated into English as Rosie Carpe by Tamsin Black – Bison Books, 2004
 Tous mes amis, nouvelles – Minuit, 2004
 Translated into English as All My Friends by Jordan Stump – Two Lines Press, 2013
 Autoportrait en vert – Mercure de France, 2005
 Translated into English as Self-Portrait in Green by Jordan Stump – Two Lines Press, 2014
 Mon cœur a l'etroit – Éditions Gallimard, 2007
 Translated into English as My Heart Hemmed In by Jordan Stump – Two Lines Press, 2017
 Trois femmes puissantes – Gallimard, Prix Goncourt, 2009.
 Translated into English as Three Strong Women by John Fletcher – MacLehose Press & Alfred A. Knopf, 2013
 Ladivine  – Gallimard, 2013
 Translated into English as Ladivine by Jordan Stump – Alfred A. Knopf, 2016 & MacLehose Press, 2016
 La Cheffe, roman d'une cuisinière – Gallimard, 2016
 Translated into English as The Cheffe by Jordan Stump – Alfred A. Knopf, 2019 & MacLehose Press, 2019

Plays
 Hilda – Minuit, 1999
 Papa doit manger – Minuit, 2003
 Rien d'humain – Les Solitaires Intempestifs, 2004
 Les serpents – Minuit, 2004

Children's novels
 La diablesse et son enfant, illustration Nadja – , 2000
 Les paradis de Prunelle, illustration Pierre Mornet – Albin Michel Jeunesse, 2003
 Le souhait, illustration Alice Charbin – École des Loisirs, 2005

Essays
 La naufragée – Flohic, 1999

Screenplay
 White Material (2009), co-written with director Claire Denis

References

External links

 Curry, Ginette. "Toubab La!": Literary Representations of Mixed-race Characters in the African Diaspora.Cambridge Scholars Pub., Newcastle, England.2007
 Bio-bibliographie de Marie NDiaye, The University of Western Australia
 Marie Ndiaye, in Label France (magazine), No. 59, 2005
 Critical bibliography (Auteurs.contemporain.info)
 "Où situer Marie Ndiaye?" by Véronique Bonnet (in French)
 The U.S. premiere of Hilda
 

1967 births
Living people
20th-century French dramatists and playwrights
21st-century French dramatists and playwrights
French women novelists
20th-century French novelists
21st-century French novelists
French people of Senegalese descent
People from Pithiviers
Prix Femina winners
Prix Goncourt winners
Lycée Lakanal alumni
20th-century French women writers
21st-century French women writers